Donnie Levert Fletcher III (born May 23, 1990) is an American football cornerback who is currently a free agent. He was signed as an undrafted free agent by the New York Jets in 2012. He played college football at Boston College.

High school career
Fletcher attended Glenville High School in Cleveland, Ohio. He earned Associated Press All-Ohio second-team honors as a senior cornerback at Glenville as well as 2007 Northeast Lakes All-District first-team accolades. He registered 105 tackles and five interceptions in his senior season; also posted 12 pass deflections, two forced fumbles and two fumble recoveries for the Tarblooders. He played for head coach Ted Ginn Sr.

Considered as a three-star recruit by Rivals.com, he was ranked as the No.45 cornerback in the nation. He accepted a scholarship from Boston College over other offers from Iowa, Michigan State and West Virginia.

College career
In 2008, fletcher saw action in all 14 games and started four as a true freshman. He finished the season with 36 tackles and 3 interceptions. In 2009, he played in all 13 games, including 3 starts. He recorded 51 tackles with an interception. He was the recipient of the Anne F. Schoen Memorial Scholarship that season. As a junior in 2010, he took over the starting position and started in all 13 games.

He recorded 58 tackles, and led the team with 5 interceptions. In his senior season in 2011, he started in 10 games, missing two due to an injury. He recorded 35 tackles including two interceptions.

Professional career

2012 NFL Draft

New York Jets
Fletcher was signed by the New York Jets as an undrafted free agent on April 29, 2012. Fletcher was waived on August 31, 2012. A day later, Fletcher was signed to the team's practice squad. Fletcher was promoted to the active roster on September 22, 2012 after the team released veteran linebacker Bryan Thomas. Fletcher was waived on September 24, 2012. He was re-signed to the practice squad a day later. Fletcher was released from the squad on October 2, 2012. Fletcher was re-signed to the practice squad on October 17, 2012. Fletcher was promoted to the active roster on November 22, 2012. Fletcher was waived on December 4, 2012. He was re-signed to the practice squad two days later. Fletcher was promoted to the active roster on December 19, 2012 after Stephen Hill was placed on injured reserve. He was released on August 26, 2013.

Los Angeles KISS
Fletcher was assigned to the Los Angeles KISS on June 26, 2014.

San Jose SaberCats
On March 18, 2015, Fletcher was assigned to the San Jose SaberCats. The SaberCats placed him on recallable reassignment on March 23, 2015.

Cleveland Gladiators
On April 22, 2015, Fletcher was assigned to the Cleveland Gladiators. On July 29, 2015, Fletcher was placed on reassignment. On July 31, 2015, Fletcher was placed on injured reserve.

References

External links
Boston College profile

1990 births
Living people
American football cornerbacks
Boston College Eagles football players
Cleveland Gladiators players
Los Angeles Kiss players
San Jose SaberCats players
New York Jets players
Players of American football from Cleveland